Günter Friesenbichler (born 4 March 1979) is a retired Austrian footballer.

He is the brother of retired footballer Bruno Friesenbichler.

References

1979 births
Living people
Austrian footballers
Austrian Football Bundesliga players
Super League Greece players
Xanthi F.C. players
Egaleo F.C. players
SV Ried players
SC Austria Lustenau players
FC Admira Wacker Mödling players
TSV Hartberg players
SC Wiener Neustadt players
Austrian expatriate footballers
Expatriate footballers in Greece
Association football forwards